Banco Nacional de Costa Rica or BNCR is the largest commercial bank in Costa Rica and the second largest in Central America by assets.

It has a 49% stake in Banco de Costa Rica International Limited (BICSA), incorporated with the Republic of Panama entity, and 100% of the shares of BN-Securities (Stock Exchange Market), BN-Vital (Operator owner pension fund), BN-SAFI (Mutual Funds) and BN insurance broker. in January 2013, the Fitch Ratings classified Banco Nacional de Costa Rica as an 'AA + (cri)' class bank.

History

Offices 
Panama - Bicsa Financial Center, Panama city
Costa Rica - Plaza Salamanca Building (Orosi Guancaste), San José
United States - 4000 Ponce de Leon Blvd, Miami

See also 
Central Bank of Costa Rica

References 

Banks of Costa Rica